Gibberula ros is a species of very small sea snail, a marine gastropod mollusk or micromollusk in the family Cystiscidae.

Description

Distribution

References

External links
 OBIS: Indo-Pacific Molluscan Database: Gibberula ros

ros
Gastropods described in 1865